Andrew Keith Dall (born 22 July 1977) is a rugby union former player and coach who gained one cap with Scotland in 2003.

Background
Dall was born on 22 July 1977 in Edinburgh, Scotland. He was a school international and played for Heriot's FP.

In 2001 he joined Edinburgh Rugby. His release from Edinburgh was announced in August 2004.

He moved to Gala as player-coach but having just been promoted BT Premiership 1, the club were relegated the following season. In 2005 he signed for Heriots again.

International career
In May 2003 he was selected for 2003 Scotland rugby union tour of South Africa.

He gained a full international cap when he came on as a replacement against Wales at the Millennium Stadium in Cardiff on 30 August 2003.

References

External links
profile at ESPN

1977 births
Living people
Rugby union players from Edinburgh
Rugby union flankers
Scottish rugby union players
Edinburgh Rugby players
Scottish rugby union coaches
Scotland international rugby union players